Reef Bay Sugar Factory Historic District is a historic section of Saint John, United States Virgin Islands located on the south central coast adjacent to Reef Bay. The land is the site of a sugar factory. The property was added to the U.S. National Register of Historic Places on July 23, 1981.

The historic district is part of Virgin Islands National Park. The park maintains an exhibit of a well-preserved sugar factory.

History

Early inhabitants
Archaeological research shows that the first inhabitants of the Virgin Islands were Ortoiroid people. The Arawaks migrated over a period of many centuries to the Virgin Islands and engaged in the first agriculture on the land. Local archaeological excavations confirm a Classic Taino culture on Saint John.

Plantation era
Intermittently starting in the 1670s, the land along the shorelines of Saint John was occupied by settlers with diverse nationalities. The property was used for maritime activities and cotton production. 

The Danish claimed Saint John on March 25, 1718. The Danish established large plantations worked by slaves brought from Africa.

The present Reef Bay Estate was formed in the mid-19th century from two neighboring plantations near Reef Bay.

Par Force Estate
Par Force Estate was located on the east side of Reef Bay Valley and early documents indicate that the land was in use at the time of the 1733 slave insurrection on St. John with Anthony Zytstems the original owner. A 1780 maps shows Zystems continuing to own the land and a sugar factory and animal mill on the property.

Reef Bay
An unnamed parcel of land located on the north east end of Reef Bay was identified on a 1780 map as being owned by C. Wyle and as a cattle and cotton plantation.

Sugar factory

The first sugar plantation on the land was started in 1725 on the Par Force Estate. Oxholm's 1800 map shows a sugar plantation with an animal mill on Par Force land.

After Reef Bay Estate was formed by joining the neighboring properties, a new sugar factory was built. The factory was used for processing sugarcane into sugar and distilling rum. The factory buildings include a boiling room, an animal-powered mill, and a still with a cooling cistern for distilling rum. 

O.I. Burguest and Company purchased the property in 1855. With W. H. March managing the estate, the sugar factory was modernized and converted to steam in the 1862. An "engine room" measuring approximately 25 feet by 27 feet was added to house the cast iron steam engine and sugar cane crushing machinery. In 1864 March purchased the property at auction and he continued to operate a sugar factory on the land until 1908. Bay Oil was produced at the factory during the St. John bay oil boom in the early 20th century.

Virgin Islands National Park
In the 1960s the sugar factory ruins were restored by Virgin Island National Park and the ruins are one of the best surviving examples of a West Indies sugar operation.

References

External links

Sugar plantations in Saint Thomas, U.S. Virgin Islands
Plantations in the Danish West Indies
National Register of Historic Places in Virgin Islands National Park
Saint John, U.S. Virgin Islands
Historic American Engineering Record in the United States Virgin Islands
History of sugar
Buildings and structures completed in 1800
Historic districts on the National Register of Historic Places in the United States Virgin Islands
Buildings and structures on the National Register of Historic Places in the United States Virgin Islands
1800 establishments in the United States
1800s establishments in the Caribbean
19th century in the Danish West Indies
Industrial buildings and structures on the National Register of Historic Places